Wolfgang Kremer (born 29 October 1945) is a German former swimmer. He competed at the 1964 Summer Olympics and the 1968 Summer Olympics.

References

External links
 

1945 births
Living people
German male swimmers
Olympic swimmers of the United Team of Germany
Olympic swimmers of West Germany
Swimmers at the 1964 Summer Olympics
Swimmers at the 1968 Summer Olympics
People from Burg bei Magdeburg
Sportspeople from Saxony-Anhalt